Piano acoustics is the set of physical properties of the piano that affect its sound. It is an area of study within musical acoustics.

String length, mass and tension

The strings of a piano vary in thickness, and therefore in mass per length, with bass strings thicker than treble.  A typical range is from 1/30 inch (0.85 mm, string size 13) for the highest treble strings to 1/3 inch (8.5 mm) for the lowest bass.  These differences in string thickness follow from well-understood acoustic properties of strings.

Given two strings, equally taut and heavy, one twice as long as the other, the longer will vibrate with a pitch one octave lower than the shorter. However, if one were to use this principle to design a piano, i.e. if one began with the highest notes and then doubled the length of the strings again and again for each lower octave, it would be impossible to fit the bass strings onto a frame of any reasonable size. Furthermore, when strings vibrate, the width of the vibrations is related to the string length; in such a hypothetical ultra-long piano, the lowest strings would strike one another when played. Instead, piano makers take advantage of the fact that a heavy string vibrates more slowly than a light string of identical length and tension; thus, the bass strings on the piano are shorter than the "double with each octave" rule would predict, and are much thicker than the others.

The other factor that can affect pitch, other than length, density and mass, is tension. Strings in an upright piano usually have a tension of 750 to 900 N (75-90 kg weight) each.

Inharmonicity and piano size

Any vibrating thing produces vibrations at a number of frequencies above the fundamental pitch. These are called overtones.  When the overtones are integer multiples (e.g., 2×, 3× ... 6× ... ) of the fundamental frequency (called harmonics), then - neglecting damping - the oscillation is periodic—i.e., it vibrates exactly the same way over and over.  Humans seem to enjoy the sound of periodic oscillations.  For this reason, many musical instruments, including pianos, are designed to produce nearly periodic oscillations, that is, to have overtones as close as possible to the harmonics of the fundamental tone.

In an ideal vibrating string, when the wavelength of a wave on a stretched string is much greater than the thickness of the string (the theoretical ideal being a string of zero thickness and zero resistance to bending), the wave velocity on the string is constant and the overtones are at the harmonics.  That is why so many instruments are constructed of skinny strings or thin columns of air.  

However, for high overtones with short wavelengths that approach the diameter of the string, the string behaves more like a thick metal bar: its mechanical resistance to bending becomes an additional force to the tension, which 'raises the pitch' of the overtones.  Only when the bending force is much smaller than the tension of the string, are its wave-speed (and the overtones pitched as harmonics) unchanged.  The frequency-raised overtones (above the harmonics), called 'partials', can produce an unpleasant effect called inharmonicity. Basic strategies to reduce inharmonicity include decreasing the thickness of the string or increasing its length, choosing a flexible material with a low bending force, and increasing the tension force so that it stays much bigger than the bending force.

Winding a string allows an effective decrease in the thickness of the string.  In a wound string, only the inner core resists bending while the windings function only to increase the linear density of the string.  The thickness of the inner core is limited by its strength and by its tension; stronger materials allow for thinner cores at higher tensions, reducing inharmonicity.  Hence, piano designers choose high-quality steel for their strings, as its strength and durability help them minimize string diameters.

If string diameter, tension, mass, uniformity, and length compromises were the only factors—all pianos could be small, spinet-sized instruments. Piano builders, however, have found that longer strings increase instrument power, harmonicity, and reverberation, and help produce a properly tempered tuning scale.

With longer strings, larger pianos achieve the longer wavelengths and tonal characteristics desired.  Piano designers strive to fit the longest strings possible within the case; moreover, all else being equal, the sensible piano buyer tries to obtain the largest instrument compatible with budget and space.

Inharmonicity increases continuously as notes get further from the middle of the piano, and is one of the practical limits on the total range of the instrument. The lowest strings, which are necessarily the longest, are most limited by the size of the piano. The designer of a short piano is forced to use thick strings to increase mass density and is thus driven into accepting greater inharmonicity.

The highest strings must be under the greatest tension, yet must also be thin enough to allow for a low mass density. The limited strength of steel (i.e. a too-thin string will break under the tension) forces the piano designer to use very short and slightly thicker strings, whose short wavelengths thus generate inharmonicity.

The natural inharmonicity of a piano is used by the tuner to make slight adjustments in the tuning of a piano.  The tuner stretches the notes, slightly sharpening the high notes and flatting the low notes to make overtones of lower notes have the same frequency as the fundamentals of higher notes.

See also Piano wire, Piano tuning, Psychoacoustics.

The Railsback curve

The Railsback curve, first measured by O.L. Railsback, expresses the difference between normal piano tuning and an equal-tempered scale (one in which the frequencies of successive notes are related by a constant ratio, equal to the twelfth root of two).  For any given note on the piano, the deviation between the normal pitch of that note and its equal-tempered pitch is given in cents (hundredths of a semitone).

As the Railsback curve shows, octaves are normally stretched on a well-tuned piano.  That is, the high notes are higher, and the low notes lower, than they are in an equal-tempered scale. Railsback discovered that pianos were typically tuned in this manner not because of a lack of precision, but because of inharmonicity in the strings.  Ideally, the overtone series of a note consists of frequencies that are integer multiples of the note's fundamental frequency.  Inharmonicity as present in piano strings makes successive overtones higher than they "should" be.

To tune an octave, a piano technician must reduce the speed of beating between the first overtone of a lower note and a higher note until it disappears. Because of inharmonicity, this first overtone is sharper than a harmonic octave (which has the ratio of 2/1), making either the lower note flatter, or the higher note sharper, depending on which one is tuned relative to the other.

To produce octaves that reflect the temperament and accommodate the inharmonicity of the instrument, the technician begins the stretch from the middle of the piano so that, as the stretch accumulates from register to register, it results in the desired stretch at the top and bottom of the instrument.

Shape of the curve

Because string inharmonicity only makes harmonics sharper (never flatter), the Railsback curve—which is functionally the integral of the inharmonicity at an octave—is monotonically increasing. A piano is tuned beginning in the center, so the Railsback curve has a shallow slope in this area. But as the piano tuner stretches octaves to compensate for inharmonicity, the stretch accumulates as tuned notes ascend and descend, so the curve becomes more pronounced at the ends.

Inharmonicity in a string is caused primarily by stiffness. Decreased length and increased thickness both contribute to that stiffness. For the middle to high part of the piano range, string thickness slowly decreases as string length quickly decreases, contributing to greater inharmonicity in the higher notes. For the low range, string thickness drastically increases—especially in shorter pianos, which must accomplish the lower pitches by using heavier strings rather than longer ones—producing greater inharmonicity in this range as well.

In the bass register, a second factor affecting inharmonicity is the resonance caused by the acoustic impedance of the piano sound board. These resonances exhibit positive feedback on the inharmonic effect: if a string vibrates at a frequency just below that of a soundboard resonance, the impedance makes it vibrate even lower, and if it vibrates just above a resonance, the impedance makes it vibrate higher. The sounding board has multiple resonant frequencies that are unique to any particular piano. This contributes to the greater variance in the empirically measured Railsback curve in the lower octaves.

The actual tuning is not a smooth curve, but a jagged line with peaks and troughs. It has been suggested with Monte-Carlo simulation that such a shape comes from the way humans match pitch intervals.

Multiple strings 

All but the lowest notes of a piano have multiple strings tuned to the same frequency.  This allows the piano to have a loud attack with a fast decay but a long sustain in the attack-decay-sustain-release (ADSR) system.

The three strings create a coupled oscillator with three normal modes (with two polarizations each).  Since the strings are only weakly coupled, the normal modes have imperceptibly different frequencies.  But they transfer their vibrational energy to the sounding board at significantly different rates.

The normal mode in which the three strings oscillate together is most efficient at transferring energy since all three strings pull in the same direction at the same time.  It sounds loud, but decays quickly.  This normal mode is responsible for the rapid staccato "Attack" part of the note.

In the other two normal modes, strings do not all pull together, e.g., one pulls up while the other two pull down.  There is a slow transfer of energy to the sounding board, generating a soft but near-constant sustain.

See also
 Electronic tuner
 Inharmonicity

References

Further reading
Ortiz-Berenguer, Luis I., F. Javier Casajús-Quirós, Marisol Torres-Guijarro, J.A. Beracoechea. Piano Transcription Using Pattern Recognition: Aspects On Parameter Extraction: Proceeds of The International Conference on Digital Audio Effects, Naples, October 2004.

External links
Five lectures on the acoustics of the piano
A. H. Benade Sound Production in Pianos
Robert W. Young, Inharmonicity of Plain Wire Piano Strings' The Journal of the Acoustical Society of America, vol 24 no. 3 (May 1952)
"The Engineering of Concert Grand Pianos" by Richard Dain, FRENG
D. Clausen, B. Hughes and W. Stuart "A design analysis of a Stuart and Sons grand piano frame"

Acoustics
Piano